Vinícius Ferreira Orlando or simply Vinícius (born September 15, 1983) is a Brazilian central defender.

Honours
Santa Catarina State League: 2003, 2004, 2006

Contract
1 January 2007 to 31 December 2008

External links
 sambafoot

 zerozero.pt
 Guardian Stats Centre
 figueirense.com

1983 births
Living people
Brazilian footballers
Figueirense FC players
Esporte Clube Santo André players
Brusque Futebol Clube players
Association football defenders